Davide Casarotto (born 19 July 1971 in Vicenza) is a former Italian cyclist.

Palmares

1995
1st Giro d'Oro
1996
1st Gran Premio della Liberazione
1997
1st Stage 2 Tirreno–Adriatico
3rd Gran Premio Industria e Commercio di Prato
3rd Grand Prix de Wallonie
3rd GP Industria & Artigianato di Larciano
5th Tour of Flanders
5th Paris–Roubaix
2000
1st Stage 4 Deutschland Tour
2001
1st Grand Prix de Rennes
1st Stage 2 Vuelta a Aragón
2nd Grand Prix de Denain
2002
1st Stage 5 Bayern-Rundfahrt

References

1971 births
Living people
Italian male cyclists
Sportspeople from Vicenza
Cyclists from the Province of Vicenza